Mohamad Zamri bin Pin Ramli (born 24 April 1991) is a Malaysian footballer who plays for Negeri Sembilan as a left back.

Club Career 
He is a former player of Felda United Football Club (FUFC) and Malaysia Indian Football Association (MISC-MIFA), now known as PJC.

In 2021 he joined the team Negeri Sembilan FC on a free transfer. Has been with the team for two years and has become a key player throughout 2022. He has helped the team secure fourth place in the Malaysia Super League in 2022. It is an impressive achievement as the team has just been promoted from the Malaysia Premier League in the previous year and had shocked the other Malaysia Super League teams as Negeri Sembilan FC was considered an underdog team. He has made 40 appearances and scored 1 goal during his time with Negeri Sembilan FC. he has made all appearances throughout 2021 and 2022 for all Malaysia Premier League 2021 and Malaysia Super League 2022 matches. He is an important player for head coach K. Devan.

Honours
Penang FA
 Malaysia Premier League :2020

References

1991 births
Living people
Malaysian footballers
Malaysia Premier League players
Malaysia Super League players
Petaling Jaya City FC players
Negeri Sembilan FC players
Association football defenders